Turgeon River (French: Rivière Turgeon) may refer to:

 Turgeon River (Harricana River), a tributary of the Harricana River, Quebec, Canada
 Turgeon River (rivière des Hurons), a river in Stoneham-et-Tewkesbury, Quebec, Canada

See also
 Turgeon (disambiguation)
 Sturgeon River (disambiguation)